The situation of human rights in Laos has often been, and remains, a recognized cause for serious concern. Laos is one of a handful of Marxist-Leninist governments and is ruled by a one-party communist government backed by the Lao People's Army in alliance with the Vietnam People's Army and the Socialist Republic of Vietnam in Hanoi.

Amnesty International, The Centre for Public Policy Analysis, the United League for Democracy in Laos, Human Rights Watch, the Lao Human Rights Council and other non-governmental organizations (NGO)s have raised repeated serious concerns about the ratification record of the Laos Government on human rights standards and its lack of cooperation with the UN human rights mechanisms and legislative measures which impact negatively on human rights. They have also raised concerns in relation to disappeared civic activist Sombath Somphone, and jailed and tortured political and religious dissidents, military attacks on unarmed civilians, as well as the lack of freedom of expression, torture, poor prison conditions, restrictions on freedom of religions, protection of refugees and asylum-seekers, extrajudicial killing and rape by the Lao People's Army and security forces and the improper use of the death penalty. Some officials and police have facilitated and profited from sex trafficking in Laos.

The purported policy objectives of both the Lao communist government and international donors remain focused toward achieving sustainable economic growth and poverty reduction, but restrictions on freedom of expression and association are a source of concern. The barring of independent human rights monitors makes an exact appraisal of the situation impossible.  In particular, the situation for groups of ethnic Hmong hiding in the jungle remains grave and leads to a steady stream of people taking refuge in neighboring Thailand.  The death penalty remains in force, although no executions have been reported since 1989.

The U.S. State Department reports on human rights around the world declare that most Lao trials in 2003 were little more than pro forma examinations of the accused, with a verdict having already been reached. The State Department indicated that in some instances police administratively overruled court decisions, at times detaining a defendant exonerated by the court, in violation of the law. Moreover, while Lao law prohibits torture, members of the security forces reportedly subjected prisoners to torture and other abuses. A significant issue in human rights in Laos is the presence of anti-government rebels, mainly of the Hmong ethnic minority, who have reportedly been harshly treated by the Lao government. In its 2006 report the State Department mentions that "The government's overall human rights record worsened during the year."  For more details see the report (link given below under "see also").

Official Lao position on human rights 
Officially, and in theory, the Constitution that was promulgated in 1991 under the Marxist-Leninist government contains most key safeguards for human rights. For example, in Article 8 it makes it clear that Laos is a multiethnic state and is committed to equality between ethnic groups. The Constitution also has provisions for gender equality and freedom of religion, for freedom of speech, press and assembly.

On 25 September 2009, Laos ratified the International Covenant on Civil and Political Rights, nine years after signing the treaty. The policy objectives of both the Lao government and international donors remain focused toward achieving sustainable economic growth and poverty reduction.  However, systemic corruption, and illegal logging also remains a serious problem among Lao government and military officials according to Transparency International and others.

However, according to Amnesty International, Human Rights Watch, the Center for Public Policy Analysis, the United League for Democracy in Laos, the Lao Human Rights Council, the Lao Veterans of America Institute, and many human rights organizations, non-governmental organizations, and policy experts, the reality in Laos is quite different, and the Marxist government generally does not abide by its own Constitution. The Lao government in Vientiane has been frequently condemned by the US Congress, United Nations Committee on Racial Discrimination, European Parliament and human rights advocates, especially in light of the imprisonment of pro-democracy Lao student leaders in October 1999, the persecution of Hmong refugees and asylum seekers and the recent abduction and disappearance of civil society leader Sombath Somphone.

The Lao government maintains very close relations with the government of North Korea and its military.

Death penalty

Between 2003 and 2009, at least 39 people were sentenced to death. 50 more people were sentenced to death in the year 2010.

Individual cases

There are many individual cases of human rights violations in Laos according to NGOs and human rights advocates.

For example, two former high-ranking government officials whose imprisonment for expressing dissident political views had been much publicized by international human rights groups were released in October 2004. A third dissident sentenced along with them died in prison in 1998. The three men had been arrested in 1990 for expressing concern about government policies and advocating economic and political reforms.

In October 1999, 30 young people were arrested for attempting to display posters calling for peaceful economic, political and social change in Laos. Five of them were arrested and subsequently sentenced to up to 10 years imprisonment on charges of treason. One has since died due to his treatment by prison guards, while one has been released. The surviving three men should have been released by October 2009, but their whereabouts remains unknown.

In 2004, a Lao Hmong refugee photographed and then smuggled video footage out of Laos of an alleged incident in which Lao government troops raped and murdered four young Hmong girls and one boy, then mutilated their bodies .
He denies claims by the Lao government that the video was a fabrication.

Hmong conflict and attacks on unarmed Hmong civilians
The government of Laos has been accused of committing genocide against that country’s Hmong ethnic minority. Some Hmong groups fought as CIA-backed units on the Royalist side in the Laos civil war. After the Pathet Lao took over the country in 1975, the conflict continued in isolated pockets. In 1977 a communist newspaper promised the party would hunt down the “American collaborators” and their families “to the last root”.

As many as 200,000 Hmong went into exile in Thailand, with many ending up in the U.S. A number of Hmong fighters hid out in mountains in Xiangkhouang Province for many years, with a remnant emerging from the jungle in 2003.

Laos and Vietnamese troops were reported to have raped and killed four Christian Hmong women in Xieng Khouang province in 2011, according to US NGO The Centre for Public Policy Analysis. CPPA also said other Christian and independent Buddhist and animist believers were being persecuted.

Amnesty International and other NGOs, journalists and human rights advocates have documented the Lao People's Army's attacks on unarmed Hmong civilians in Laos.

Hmong refugees and forced repatriation

In 1989, the United Nations High Commissioner for Refugees (UNHCR), with the support of the United States government, instituted the Comprehensive Plan of Action, a program to stem the tide of Indochinese refugees from Laos, Vietnam, and Cambodia. Under the plan, the status of the refugees was to be evaluated through a screening process. Recognized asylum seekers were to be given resettlement opportunities, while the remaining refugees were to be repatriated under guarantee of safety.

After talks with the UNHCR and the Thai government, Laos agreed to repatriate the 60,000 Lao refugees living in Thailand, including several thousand Hmong people. Very few of the Lao refugees, however, were willing to return voluntarily. Pressure to resettle the refugees grew as the Thai government worked to close its remaining refugee camps. While some Hmong people returned to Laos voluntarily, with development assistance from UNHCR, allegations of forced repatriation surfaced. Of those Hmong who did return to Laos, some quickly escaped back to Thailand, describing discrimination and brutal treatment at the hands of Lao authorities.

In 1993, Vue Mai, a former Hmong soldier who had been recruited by the U.S. Embassy in Bangkok to return to Laos as proof of the repatriation program's success, disappeared in Vientiane. According to the U.S. Committee for Refugees, he was arrested by Lao security forces and was never seen again.

Following the Vue Mai incident, debate over the Hmong's planned repatriation to Laos intensified greatly, especially in the U.S., where it drew strong opposition from many American conservatives and some human rights advocates.  In an October 23, 1995 National Review article, Michael Johns, the former Heritage Foundation foreign policy expert and Republican White House aide, labeled the Hmong's repatriation a Clinton administration "betrayal," describing the Hmong as a people "who have spilled their blood in defense of American geopolitical interests." Debate on the issue escalated quickly.  In an effort to halt the planned repatriation, the Republican-led U.S. Senate and U.S. House of Representatives both appropriated funds for the remaining Thailand-based Hmong to be immediately resettled in the U.S.; Clinton, however, responded by promising a veto of the legislation.

In their opposition of the repatriation plans, Republicans also challenged the Clinton administration's position that the Laotian government was not systematically violating Hmong human rights.  U.S. Representative Steve Gunderson (R-WI), for instance, told a Hmong gathering: "I do not enjoy standing up and saying to my government that you are not telling the truth, but if that is necessary to defend truth and justice, I will do that." Republicans also called several Congressional hearings on alleged persecution of the Hmong in Laos in an apparent attempt to generate further support for their opposition to the Hmong's repatriation to Laos.

Although some accusations of forced repatriation were denied, thousands of Hmong people refused to return to Laos. In 1996, as the deadline for the closure of Thai refugee camps approached, and under mounting political pressure, the U.S. agreed to resettle Hmong refugees who passed a new screening process. Around 5,000 Hmong people who were not resettled at the time of the camp closures sought asylum at Wat Tham Krabok, a Buddhist monastery in central Thailand where more than 10,000 Hmong refugees were already living. The Thai government attempted to repatriate these refugees, but the Wat Tham Krabok Hmong refused to leave and the Lao government refused to accept them, claiming they were involved in the illegal drug trade and were of non-Lao origin.

In 2003, following threats of forcible removal by the Thai government, the U.S., in a significant victory for the Hmong, agreed to accept 15,000 of the refugees. Several thousand Hmong people, fearing forced repatriation to Laos if they were not accepted for resettlement in the U.S., fled the camp to live elsewhere within Thailand where a sizable Hmong population has been present since the 19th century.

In 2004 and 2005, thousands of Hmong fled from the jungles of Laos to a temporary refugee camp in the Thai province of Phetchabun. These Hmong refugees, many of whom are descendants of the former-CIA Secret Army and their relatives, claim that they have been attacked by both the Lao and Vietnamese military forces operating inside Laos as recently as June 2006. The refugees claim that attacks against them have continued almost unabated since the war officially ended in 1975, and have become more intense in recent years.

Lending further support to earlier claims that the government of Laos was persecuting the Hmong, filmmaker Rebecca Sommer documented first-hand accounts in her documentary, Hunted Like Animals, and in a comprehensive report which includes summaries of claims made by the refugees and was submitted to the U.N. in May 2006.

The European Union, UNHCHR, and international groups have since spoken out about the forced repatriation. The Thai foreign ministry has said that it will halt deportation of Hmong refugees held in Detention Centers Nong Khai, while talks are underway to resettle them in Australia, Canada, the Netherlands and the United States.

For the time being, countries willing to resettle the refugees are hindered to proceed with immigration and settlement procedures because the Thai administration does not grant them access to the refugees. Plans to resettle additional Hmong refugees in the U.S. have been complicated by provisions of President George W. Bush's Patriot Act and Real ID Act, under which Hmong veterans of the Secret War, who fought on the side of the United States, are classified as terrorists because of their historical involvement in armed conflict.

On December 27, 2009, The New York Times reported that the Thai military was preparing to forcibly return 4,000 Hmong asylum seekers to Laos by the end of the year: the BBC later reported that repatriations had started. Both United States and United Nations officials have protested this action. Outside government representatives have not been allowed to interview this group over the last three years. Médecins Sans Frontières has refused to assist the Hmong refugees because of what they have called "increasingly restrictive measures" taken by the Thai military. The Thai military jammed all cellular phone reception and disallowed any foreign journalists from the Hmong camps.

See also
 Internet censorship and surveillance in Laos
Amnesty International
Sombath Somphone
the Center for Public Policy Analysis
United League for Democracy in Laos
Lao Human Rights Council, Inc.
Lao Veterans of America Institute
Lao Veterans of America
Hmong people
US Commission on International Religious Freedom
 Laotian penal system
 LGBT rights in Laos

References

External links
 Center for Public Policy Analysis
US State Department report on human rights in Laos 2006
Amnesty International Annual Report 2007
Censorship in Laos

 
Laos
Society of Laos
Politics of Laos
Government of Laos